Maria (Mary) Servaes-Beij (Leiden, 5 August 1919 – Horn, Netherlands, 23 October 1998) was a Dutch levenslied singer. She performed under the stage name Zangeres Zonder Naam (English: Singer without a name). She recorded almost 600 songs over the course of her career.

Servaes-Beij cared about the poor and disadvantaged, and often performed in prisons and hospitals. She was regularly in direct contact with her public, and received many emotional letters. The Zangeres Zonder Naam was one of the artists who performed at the Dutch Miami Nightmare concert (Amsterdam, 8 October 1977). This evening was directed against Anita Bryant and her anti-gay movement, and the Zangeres Zonder Naam performed her own song Luister Anita ("Anita, listen to me"), in which she compared Bryant with Hitler.

References

External links
 

1919 births
1998 deaths
Dutch levenslied singers
People from Leiden
Converts to Roman Catholicism from Calvinism
20th-century Dutch women singers